The men's 4 × 400 metres relay was a track and field athletics event held as part of the Athletics at the 1912 Summer Olympics programme.  It was the debut of the event, which along with the 4 × 100 metre relay marked the first relays of equal legs in the athletics programme (a medley relay had been held in 1908). The competition was held on Sunday, July 14, 1912, and on Monday, July 15, 1912. Twenty-eight runners from seven nations competed. NOCs could enter 1 team of 4 athletes, with up to 2 reserves.

Records

These were the standing world and Olympic records (in minutes) prior to the 1912 Summer Olympics.

Great Britain, in the first semifinal, set the inaugural Olympic record with 3:19.0. 

In the final, the United States set a new world record with 3:16.6.

Results

Semifinals

All semifinals were held on Sunday, July 14, 1912.

Semifinal 1

Semifinal 2

Semifinal 3

Final

The final was held on Monday, July 15, 1912.

References

External links
 
 

Relay 4x400
Relay foot races at the Olympics